Nauroy is a commune in the Aisne department in Hauts-de-France in northern France.

Population

Notable people 
 Désiré François Laugée (1823-1896), painter and poet, mayor of Nauroy in the 1880s.
 Georges Laugée (1853-1937), Naturalist French painter of the 19th and early 20th century, son of the preceding. Part of his work dedicated to the life of peasants in the fields was set in Nauroy. His daughter, Désirée Françoise, married Edmond Eggli (1881-1956) in  Nauroy on 18 July 1914.
 Joachim Pierre Joseph Malézieux (1851-1906), né à Nauroy, dessinateur et poète, auteur de nombreux dessins des églises de la région.
 Maurice Vernes (1845-1923), French theologian, born in Nauroy

See also
Communes of the Aisne department

References

Communes of Aisne
Aisne communes articles needing translation from French Wikipedia